Hyposmocoma ochreocervina is a species of moth of the family Cosmopterigidae. It was first described by Lord Walsingham in 1907.

It is endemic to the Hawaiian island of Oahu.

The food plant is unknown, but the moths were found on Metrosideros.

External links

ochreocervina
Endemic moths of Hawaii
Biota of Oahu
Waianae Range
Moths described in 1907
Taxa named by Thomas de Grey, 6th Baron Walsingham